Aleuron neglectum is a moth of the family Sphingidae. It was described by Walter Rothschild and Karl Jordan in 1903.

Distribution 
It is found from Mexico, Belize, Guatemala, Costa Rica, south through the rest of Central America and much of South America, including northern, central and southern Venezuela to Peru, Bolivia, Brazil and Argentina. There is one record from China, but this is probably a misidentification or accidental import.

Biology 
In French Guiana, adults are on wing in March, August and October. In Brazil, adults have been recorded in February and May. They visit puddles and frequently nectar at flowers of Duranta repens.

The larvae probably feed on Curatella americana and other members of family Dilleniaceae. They have also been reported feeding on Curatella, Doliocarpus, Davilla nitida and Tetracera.

References

Aleuron
Moths described in 1903
Moths of North America
Moths of South America